Tarta or TARTA may refer to: 

Tartá, real name Vinícius Silva Soares, (born 1989), Brazilian footballer
Tarta, a character in Magic Knight Rayearth. See list 
Alexandre Tarta fr (born 1928), French TV and film director and producer
Tarta de Santiago, literally meaning cake of St. James, an almond cake or pie from Galicia
Tarta de seso, a beef brain pie in Colombian cuisine
Toledo Area Regional Transit Authority

See also
Aqua Tarta Music, Canadian record label 
Tartas (disambiguation)